Moba may refer to:
 Moba, Democratic Republic of the Congo, a town 
 Moba, Nigeria, a local government area	
 Moba language

MOBA may refer to:
 Multiplayer online battle arena, a video game genre
 Museum of Bad Art, in Massachusetts
 Molybdenum cofactor guanylyltransferase, an enzyme